Ricardo Pinto may refer to:
Ricardo Pinto (novelist) (born 1961), Portuguese novelist and computer scientist
Ricardo Pinto (footballer, born 1965), Brazilian footballer
Ricardo Pinto (footballer, born 1993), Portuguese footballer
Ricardo Pinto (baseball) (born 1994), Venezuelan baseball pitcher